The Matsu Islands ( or , ; Foochow Romanized: Mā-cū liĕk-dō̤), officially Lienchiang County (Foochow Romanized: Lièng-gŏng-gâing), are an archipelago of 36 islands and islets in the East China Sea governed by the Republic of China (ROC) based in Taiwan, with its location sitting alongside southeastern coast of mainland China. It is the smallest county in the ROC-controlled territories by area and population, as well as one of two counties that were part of the nominal Fujian Province.

The current Lienchiang County of the ROC was once part of an intact Lienchiang County of Fujian before its effective partition in 1949 following the Chinese Civil War, which resulted in the mainland portion of the county being controlled by the People's Republic of China (PRC), while the offshore islands of Matsu remained under ROC control. The circumstance has made the county the only former geographical unit which is now divided between the administrations of the ROC and the PRC.

Name
Lienchiang County, Taiwan (R.O.C.) uses the  traditional Chinese characters name and the romanized name Lienchiang which is derived from the Wade-Giles romanization (Lien²-chiang¹) of the Mandarin pronunciation for those Chinese characters that also refer to Lianjiang County, Fuzhou, Fujian in mainland China. Lienchiang has also been written as Lien-chiang and Lienkiang and by a postal romanization of the local language pronunciation Lienkong. The term Lienchiang can also refer to the homophonous Lianjiang in Zhanjiang, Guangdong, China.

The Matsu Islands are named after the main island, Nangan (Nankan). Nangan is also named Matsu Island because of a temple on the island which is supposed to be the burial site of the similarly named goddess Mazu. Matsu is the Wade-Giles-derived romanization of the Mandarin pronunciation (Ma³-tsu³) for the Chinese character name of the islands.

In April 2003, the Lienchiang County government considered changing the name of the county to Matsu County in order to avoid confusion with the nearby Lianjiang County on the mainland. Then-Magistrate Chen Hsueh-sheng said some local people opposed the name change because they felt it reflected the pro-independence viewpoint of the Democratic Progressive Party.

History

Yuan Dynasty
Chinese from Fujian and Zhejiang started migrating to the islands during the Yuan Dynasty. Most of the people on Matsu came from Houguan (today Changle, Fujian). The popular net fishing industry had established the base for development of Fuao settlement and industrial development of the region over several hundred years.

Ming Dynasty
Some crewmen of Zheng He temporarily stayed on the islands.

Qing Dynasty

During the early Qing Dynasty, pirates gathered here and the residents left temporarily. In contrast with Taiwan and Penghu, the Matsu Islands were not ceded to the Japanese Empire via the Treaty of Shimonoseki in 1895. Due to its strategic location along the only route for the spice traffic, the British established the Dongyong Lighthouse in Dongyin Island in 1912 to facilitate ships navigation.

Republic of China
In 1911, the Qing Dynasty was toppled after the Xinhai Revolution on 10 October 1911 and the Republic of China (ROC) was established on 1 January 1912. Matsu Islands were subsequently governed under the administration of Fukien Province of the ROC. On 1 August 1927, the Nanchang Uprising broke out between the ruling Nationalist Party of China (KMT) and Chinese Communist Party (CCP) which marked the beginning of Chinese Civil War. 

On 10 September 1937, Japan occupied Beigan and Nangan via the Collaborationist Chinese Army, making the islands the first in Fujian to fall to Japan. The islands were not occupied by Japanese troops  during World War II because they were not important militarily. The Lienchiang County seat was moved to Danyang Township on 19 April 1941 until the Japanese surrender took place on August 15, 1945.

As a result of the Chinese Civil War, in 1949 the Chinese Communist Party (CCP) took over mainland China from the Chinese Nationalist Party (Kuomintang, KMT). The CCP established the People's Republic of China (PRC) on 1 October 1949, which included administration of today's Lianjiang County of Fujian. The KMT retreated from mainland China to Taiwan at the end of 1949, but retained some of the offshore parts of Lienchiang County (namely, the Matsu Islands), and also most of Kinmen County (Quemoy). On 15 December 1950, the Matsu Administrative Office of Fujian Province, Republic of China, was established, including modern-day Lienchiang County (the Matsu Islands), as well as islands in present-day Haidao Township, Xiapu County and Taishan in present-day Shacheng, Fuding, Ningde, Fujian, China (PRC) which were attacked in 1950 and 1951.

In early July 1953, Chinese Nationalist guerillas retreated from islands in the Xiyang Island (Chihchutao) area of present-day Haidao Township (PRC), and the area came under the control of the PRC. In June 1955, the PRC undertook considerable road and military construction around Haitan Island, Pingtan County, Fuzhou, Fujian, China, including roads leading to possible artillery positions on the mainland. Those positions might have been used to protect the Haitan Strait, which was considered a favorable staging area for amphibious operations against the Matsu Islands. In July 1958, the PRC began massing forces opposite Kinmen (Quemoy) and Matsu (Lienchiang) and began bombarding them on 23 August, triggering the Second Taiwan Strait Crisis. On 4 September 1958, the PRC announced the extension of its territorial waters by 20 kilometres (12 mi) to include the two islands. However, later that month, after talks between the USA and PRC in Warsaw, Poland, a ceasefire was agreed and the status quo reaffirmed.

The phrase "Quemoy and Matsu" became part of American political language in the 1960 U.S. presidential election. During the debates, both candidates, Vice-President Richard Nixon and Senator John F. Kennedy, pledged to use American forces if necessary to protect Taiwan from invasion by the PRC, which the United States did not recognize as the legitimate government of China. However, in the second debate on 7 October 1960, the two candidates stated different opinions about whether American forces should also be used to protect Taiwan's forward positions, Quemoy and Matsu. Senator Kennedy stated that these islands—as little as 9 kilometres (5.5 mi) off the coast of China and as much as 170 kilometres (106 mi) from Taiwan—were strategically indefensible and were not essential to the defense of Taiwan. Vice-President Nixon maintained that since Quemoy and Matsu were in the "area of freedom", they should not, as a matter of principle, be surrendered to the Communists.

Earlier in the debate, Nixon said:

Later in the debate, Edward P. Morgan asked Senator Kennedy:

Kennedy's response was:

Vice President Nixon retorted:

After the third debate on 13 October 1960, Kennedy's advisers spoke with then Secretary of State Herter and said Kennedy was willing to revise his position on the Quemoy and Matsu issue so as not to give the Communists the impression that the USA would not stand united against aggression. Nixon pointed out the change in Kennedy's position but decided not to press the point due to the importance of the USA's role in what was an extremely tense situation. Polls of Republicans and Democrats showed overwhelming support for Nixon's position.

Self-governance of the county resumed in 1992, after the cessation of political warfare with the mainland and the abolition of Battle Field Administration on 7 November 1992. Afterwards, local construction picked up pace. In 1999, the islands were designated as the Matsu National Scenic Area Administration. In January 2001, direct cargo and passenger shipping started between Matsu and Fujian Province of the PRC. After 1 January 2015, tourists from mainland China could directly apply the Exit and Entry Permit upon arrival in Matsu Islands. That privilege also applied to Penghu and Kinmen, as a means to boost tourism in the outlying islands of Taiwan. In December 2015, the Huangqi-Matsu ship route was introduced as part of the Mini Three Links.

In 2020, rampant illegal sand mining by Chinese ships in the waters around the Matsu Islands caused concern in the islands and in the Executive Yuan about damage to the marine environment, possible damage to underwater telecommunications cables, and the potential for coastal erosion. Auctioning impounded ships was seen as an easy way for the dredging companies to get their ships back via intermediaries, hence sinking the impounded ships was under consideration.

In 2021, it was reported that  hundreds of Chinese squid fishing boats surrounded Matsu, and the lights from the boats to attract the squid lit up the local sky in green at night.

In February 2023, 2 submarine cables between Matsu and Taiwan island were completely cut, causing Matsu residents' communication services to be affected.

Geography

The Matsu Islands comprise 19 islands and islets, which include five major islands, which are Nangan, Dongju and Xiju (both in Juguang Township), Beigan and Dongyin. Minor islands include Liang Island, Gaodeng Island, Daqiu Island and Xiaoqiu, which are part of Beigan Township. The shortest distance between Huangqi, Lianjiang County and the Matsu Islands is also the shortest distance between China (PRC) administered territory and territory in the ROC (Taiwan)-administered Matsu Islands.

Dongyin is the northernmost and Dongju is the southernmost.

 Dongyin is 100 nautical miles (190 km) from Keelung, Taiwan, 180 to the Penghu islands, and slightly over 10 nautical miles (19 km) from Mainland China.
 The soil is not ideal for farming.
 The highest point is on Beigan, 298 metres (978').

Areas: 
 Nangan: 
 Beigan: 
 Dongyin: 
 Juguang islands: see Juguang

Geology 
The islands are predominantly composed of Jurassic and Cretaceous intrusive (emplaced ~160 Ma, ∼130 Ma and ∼94 Ma) granite and diabase.

Climate
Average annual temperature is 18.6 °C (65°F), with the average low being at 13 °C (55°F) and average high at 29 °C (85°F). The daily temperature varies greatly during day and night. The region experiences subtropical maritime climate, which is influenced by monsoon and ocean currents and its geographic location. Matsu has four seasons: during winter it is cold and wet, during summer and spring it is foggy, and during autumn the weather is generally stable.

Politics and government

Matsu Islands are administered as Lienchiang County under the Fujian Provincial Government. Nangan Township is the county seat which houses the Lienchiang County Government and Lienchiang County Council. The county is headed by a magistrate, elected every four years in the ROC local elections. The incumbent magistrate is Liu Cheng-ying of Kuomintang. The Lienchiang County Council seat is dominated by Kuomintang legislators.

Administrative divisions
Lienchiang County is divided into four rural townships. It is further divided into 22 villages and 137 neighborhoods (鄰). Lienchiang County is the only county in Taiwan which does not have a city or an urban township. The county seat is Nangan Township (Nankan).

All the townships administer more than one island.

Magistrates
Before 1993, county magistrates were appointed.
Elected magistrates
 Tsao Chang-Shun (1993-1997) (KMT)
 Liu Li-Chun (1997-2001) (KMT)
 Chen Hsueh-sheng, also the current national representative of Matsu. (2001-2009) (PFP, later KMT)
 Yang Sui-sheng (2009–2014) (KMT)
 Liu Cheng-ying (2014–2022) (KMT)
 Wang Chung-ming (2022–present) (KMT)

Military
The Matsu Islands are protected by the ROC Army Matsu Defense Command.

Politics
Lienchang County voted one Kuomintang legislator out of one seat to be in the Legislative Yuan during the 2016 Republic of China legislative election.
While the Democratic Progressive Party have had difficulty winning a county-level election in this area, most of the competitions are among local strategies. In 2018, a Green Party member, 蘇柏豪 attempted to run for magistrate but failed.

Cross-Strait relations
 The PRC claims the three northern townships of the Matsu Islands as Matsu Township (Mā-cū hiŏng) and the Juguang Islands (the southernmost islands, formerly named the Baiquan Islands) as part of Changle District.

Vessels from the Taiwan's Coast Guard Administration (CGA) have confronted sand dredging by Chinese vessels near the Matsu Islands. This dredging activity began in 2018. Since March 2019, the Lienchiang Cross-Strait Matters Forum started as an official forum between Lienchiang County of the Republic of China (Taiwan) and Lianjiang County of the People's Republic of China to discuss matters regarding the two sides.

Demographics and culture

Population
The majority of native Matsu Islands residents originated from Northern Fujian. Several of the islands of Matsu are not inhabited permanently. Some of these are garrisoned by soldiers from the Republic of China Armed Forces stationed in the county since the end of the Chinese Civil War in 1949 and during the First and Second Taiwan Strait Crisis in 1954 and 1958 respectively. Due to that high military demand  large numbers of military personnel stationed on the islands produced unprecedented population growth in the county. The population reached its peak in 1971 with a total of 17,088 people. After those periods of high growth the population decreased year after year due to the poor economic growth which resulted in mass youth emigration due to lack of employment opportunities. In recent years the population in the county has gradually increased because of immigration. The population has stabilized due to the improved transportation between Taiwan Island and Matsu Islands as well as mass construction projects.

Languages
The native language spoken by Matsu residents is Matsu dialect, a subdialect of Fuzhou dialect, which is one of the statutory languages for public transport announcements in the Matsu Islands. Mandarin Chinese is one of the official languages of Lienchiang County.

Name
Chen (陳) is the most common surname, then Lin (林), Wang (王), Tsao (曹) and Liu (劉).

Belief
Matsu, though named after the goddess Matsu, is written with a different character that has a different tone. But the Matsu Islands are not the birthplace of the goddess as the human Lin Muoniang - Meizhou Island is — but her death place (on a seaport named after her on Nangan Island).

The Matsu Nangan Tianhou Temple, a temple dedicated to the goddess, contains the sarcophagus of Lin Muoniang. It is, however, not as popular as the Meizhou temple.

Most Taiwanese pilgrims to Meizhou start off their journey in the Matsu Islands because they are the closest ROC-controlled territory to Meizhou, which is controlled by the PRC.

Economy

Due to its geographically remote location, the manufacturing business of Matsu has never been fully developed. Among them, the wine making industry of Matsu Distillery is the most distinguished feature. Tourism has become a highly important feature of the economy.

However, most of its commercial trading focuses on retail businesses and restaurants for stationed military consumption. Farm products of Matsu include rice, sugar cane, tea plant, oranges. Sea animals, such as fish, clams, and jellyfish, are also popular exports due to its nature as the major traditional industry in Matsu. However, the flourishing fishing ground is almost exhausted by arbitrary fish bombing by Mainland China fishing boats, while the fish population is decreasing as well.

In July 2012, Matsu residents voted in favor of the establishment of casinos, which led to the prospect of gaming industries in the county and the passing of the Gaming Act.

Infrastructure

Power generation
On 1 July 1975, the Matsu Power Company was founded to operate all of the power plants in the county. On 1 July 1986, the company was incorporated into Taiwan Power Company. The county is powered up by its fuel-fired (diesel) Zhushan Power Plant located in Cingshuei Village of Nangan Township with a capacity of 15.4 MW commissioned on 22 March 2010. The other power plants are Beigan Power Plant in Beigan Township, Dongyin Power Plant in Dongyin Township and Dongju Power Plant in Dongju Island and Xiju Power Plant in Xiju Island of Juguang Township. The county is also powered up by its photovoltaic system with a capacity of 0.074 MW.

Telecommunication
For telecommucation, Matsu Islands is connected via three submarine communications cables named Taima Cables. To Taiwan Island, the Taima Cable No. 2 connects Dongyin Township in the county to Tamsui District in New Taipei and Taima Cable No. 3 connects Nangan Township to Taoyuan City. As of 2023, the fourth cable is under construction with expected completion date in 2025. The first cable is no longer in use.

Pollution
Generally, the environment of Matsu Islands is still well-preserved. The major source of pollution is from family and military household waste. There are, however, concerns that the continued lack of modern sewage facilities results in household waste seeping into groundwater.

Tourism

Tourism has become a critical sector in the local economy. Lienchiang County Government is making an effort to attract more visitors to the Matsu Islands, especially among foreigners. Dongyin Visitor Center is the main visitor center of the township.

Nangan is the capital of Matsu and it is noted for its granite tunnel and the Iron Fort. It has two interconnected main roads.

The Beihai Tunnels are manmade granite tunnels. Both tunnels were remarkable for their time, and they took great effort to construct. The tunnel in Nangan was built in 1968. The completion of Beihai Tunnel took the effort of thousands of men. The 700 metre (800 yard) tunnel has a width of 10 metres (33') and a height of 16 metres (52'). It was completed in 820 days with shovels, spades and explosives; the tunnel also took the life of a platoon of soldiers. The tunnel was considered a military location and was not opened to the public until 1990.

The Iron Fort is located on the Southwest side of Nangan island.  Located by a small cliff, it is a vulnerable spot for outside attacks or illegal smuggling of materials. With that in mind, the fort was built for defence. It is equipped with multiple machinegun rooms and rudimentary living facilities. It is now open to the public, and although most of the equipment has been removed from the site, the site itself brings back a vivid image of what it was like for soldiers at that time.

Museums in Matsu including the Matsu Blue Tears Ecological Museum, Matsu Folk Culture Museum, Ching-kuo Memorial Hall and War and Peace Memorial Park Exhibition Center.

Nature
It contains 30 species in 15 orders, mostly gulls and terns. In 2000, four pairs of the critically endangered Chinese crested tern, previously thought to be extinct, were discovered nesting on the Matsu Islands, giving them global conservation importance.

There are also mosses and ferns rare or absent elsewhere in the ROC.

Cetacean species that have become rare along Chinese coasts are still present here such as false killer whales and finless porpoises, providing opportunistic observations at times. Finless porpoises in this areas are generally smaller than other subspecies, and it is unique that two subspecies inhabit in this region where Matsu region is the northern limit for one of them.

Transportation

Air
Both Nangan and Beigan have airports which are the Matsu Nangan Airport and Matsu Beigan Airport respectively. Dongyin and Juguang (in Xiju Island) house heliports which only operate during winter time and priority is given to local residents to travel to Nangan.

Sea
Due to the main airport being located in Nangan, boats are the main form of transportation between the islands in the county.

There are two ferry rides to Mainland China. One arrives at Mawei District of Fuzhou and departs from Fuao Harbor at Nangan Township in which the journey normally takes 90 minutes while in Nangan. Another arrives at Huangqi of Lianjiang and departs from Beigan Township in which the journey takes only 20 minutes. Dongyin Township houses the Zhongzhu Harbor.

Road
Due to their size, travelling by motorized scooter is an ideal way to get around the main islands such as Nangan and Beigan, despite the steep hills. Both Islands have regular buses and taxis are also economical. In October 2019, Mainland China announced 'initial plans' to build a bridge linking Fuzhou to the Matsu Islands. Taiwan's Mainland Affairs Council (MAC) said that the plans were made unilaterally by Mainland's Fujian as part of its schemes to absorb Taiwan and divide Taiwanese society and that they see no need for bridges linking either Matsu or Kinmen to Mainland China.

Notable persons
 Chen Pao-yu, Chief of Staff of the Republic of China Army (2019-)

See also
Matsu Daily
Lianjiang County(located in mainland China)
Administrative divisions of the Republic of China
List of Taiwanese superlatives
List of cities in the Republic of China
List of islands of the Republic of China

Notes

References

External links 

 Military importance from www.globalsecurity.org
 Smaller map (from CNN)
 Name change: Taipei Times article
 Matzu Scenic Area
 Satellite image of the Nangan and Beigan islands by Google Maps
 Island Fantasia: Imagining Subjects on the Military Frontline between China and Taiwan

 
Islands of the East China Sea
Archipelagoes of the Pacific Ocean
Archipelagoes of Taiwan
Taiwan Strait
Territorial disputes of China
Territorial disputes of the Republic of China
Islands of Fujian, Republic of China